XDF may refer to:

 Extensible Data Format
 Hubble eXtreme Deep Field
 IBM Extended Density Format
 Xonotic DeFRaG